Nausharo is located in Balochistan, Pakistan.  It is well known as an archaeological site for the Harappan period. The excavations were carried out between 1985 and 1996 by a French team of archaeologists, under the direction of Jean-François Jarrige. The other sites belonging to the same cluster are Mehrgarh and Pirak.

Nausharo excavation
Excavations at Nausharo, 6 km from Mehrgarh, revealed a dwelling-site contemporaneous and identical to the later periods of Mehrgarh. It was occupied between 3000 and 2550 BC and again between 2550 and 1900 BC.

Pottery workshop 

The discovery of a pottery workshop at Nausharo revealed fired and unfired pottery pieces and unworked clay, as well as 12 flint blades or blade fragments. The blades showed use-wear traces that indicates their usage in shaving clay while shaping pottery on a potter's wheel. The excavated blades were compared to experimentally produced replica blades used for a variety of other activities such as harvesting and processing of silica-rich plants, hide processing, and hand-held use for shaping clay; however, the use-wear traces were almost identical to the excavated blades when used with a mechanical potter's wheel in the shaping of clay pots. Also significant was the discovery of copper traces found on the platforms of two blades examined with a scanning electron microscope and X ray analysis.

Chronology
Mature Indus Valley Civilisation is believed to begin around 2600–2450 BC, during Mehrgarh VII period (2600 BC–2000 BC). This time period also corresponds to Nausharo I (Kot Diji Phase), and Nausharo II periods.

Somewhere between 2600 BC and 2000 BC (Mehrgarh Period VII), Mehrgarh seems to have been largely abandoned in favor of Nausharo, which became fortified and quite large. Historian Michael Wood suggests this abandonment took place around 2500 BCE.

According to Jarrige, period I of Nausharo corresponds to Mehrgarth VII, while periods II and III were during the mature Harappan civilization.

The more detailed chronology of Nausharo is usually given as follows,

 Period IA c. 2900-2800 BC
 Period IB c. 2800-2700 BC
 Period IC c. 2700-2600 BC
 Period ID c. 2600-2550 BC (transition period)
 Period IIA c. 2550-2300 BC
 Period IIB c. 2300-1900 BC
 Period III c. 1900-1800 BC

See also
 Indus Valley civilization
 List of Indus Valley Civilization sites
 List of inventions and discoveries of the Indus Valley Civilization
 Hydraulic engineering of the Indus Valley Civilization
 Mehrgarh
 Pirak

Further reading
Jarrige, Catherine; Une tête d'éléphant en terre cuite de Nausharo (Pakistan) [An elephant's head in terracotta:Nausharo (Pakistan)] (French).

References

External links
 Cooking pots, Nausharo
 Toy carts, Nausharo
 Centre for Archaeological Research Indus Balochistan

Archaeological sites in Balochistan, Pakistan
Indus Valley civilisation sites
History of Balochistan
Former populated places in Pakistan
Pre-Indus Valley civilisation sites